Below is a list of former members of the American Wrestling Association (AWA), an American professional wrestling organization based out of Minnesota.

AWA wrestlers
Deceased individuals are indicated with a dagger (†).

 Adrian Adonis
 Badd Company (Paul Diamond & Pat Tanaka)
 Ox Baker 
 Blackjack Mulligan
 Bob Backlund
 Red Bastien
 Crusher Jerry Blackwell
 Nick Bockwinkel
 Dino Bravo 
 Bruiser Brody
 Jim Brunzell
 Édouard Carpentier
 Hercules Cortez
 The Crusher
 Colonel DeBeers
 Derrick Dukes
 The Destruction Crew (Mike Enos & Wayne Bloom)
 Bobby Duncum
 The Fabulous Freebirds (Michael P.S. Hayes, Terry "Bamm Bamm" Gordy & Buddy Roberts)
 Juan Kachmanian a.k.a. Pampero Firpo
 Ric Flair
 Greg Gagne
 Verne Gagne
 John Paul
 Jimmy Garvin
 Pepper Gomez
 "Superstar" Billy Graham
 Scott Hall
 Stan Hansen
 Lawrence Heinemi a.k.a. Larry Heinimi, Luscious Lars Anderson
 Curt Hennig
 Larry Hennig
 Horst Hoffman 
 Hulk Hogan
 Don Jardine a.k.a. The Super Destroyer
 Kenny Jay a.k.a. the Sodbuster a.k.a. Capable Kenny Jay
 Sheik Adnan El Kaissey
 "Mr. Magnificent" Kevin Kelly
 Teijo Khan
 Kokina Maximus
 Steve Keirn
 Ivan Koloff
 Nikita Koloff
 Stan Kowalski, a.k.a. The Big 'K'
 Jack Lanza
 Stan Lane
 Jerry Lawler
 The Long Riders (Bill Irwin & Scott Irwin)
 Jerry Lynn
 Billy Red Lyons
 Rick Martel
 Wahoo McDaniel
 Mighty Igor
 The Ninja
 Nick Kiniski
 Robert Fuller
 Jimmy Golden
 The Nasty Boys (Brian Knobs and Jerry Sags)
 Steve Olsonoski
 Ivan Putski
 The Rockers (Shawn Michaels & Marty Jannetty)
 Nord the Barbarian
 The Midnight Express (Dennis Condrey & Randy Rose)
 Reggie Parks
 Ken Patera
 D. J. Peterson
 Robert Gibson
 Ricky Morton
 Harley Race
 "Mr. Electricity" Steve Regal
 Brad Rheingans
 Dusty Rhodes & Dick Murdoch
 Ricky Rice
 The Road Warriors (Animal & Hawk)
 Billy Robinson
 Buddy Rose
 The Russian Brute
 Masa Saito
 Akio Sato
 Dutch Savage
 David Schultz
 Sgt. Slaughter
 Superfly Snuka 
 Doug Somers
 Dennis Stamp
 Ray "The Crippler" Stevens
 Chris Taylor
 Texas Hangmen (Psycho & Killer)
 The Trooper (a.k.a. The Patriot)
 Soldat Ustinov
 "Mad Dog" Vachon
 "Butcher" Vachon
 Jesse Ventura
 Baron von Raschke
 Leon White
 Bill Watts
 Larry Zbyszko
 Tom Zenk
 Boris Zhukov
 Buck Zumhofe
 Tim Woods
 Man Mountain Mike
 Buddy Landel
 Bob Orton Jr.
 Tully Blanchard
 Mongolian Stomper
 Ron Garvin
 Roger Kirby
 Héctor Guerrero
 Mando Guerrero
 Tommy Jammer
 J. T. Southern
 Silo Sam
 Mr. Hughes
 Tommy Rich
 Scott Norton
 Nightstalker
 B. Brian Blair
Bobby Fulton and Jackie Fulton

AWA/WWA wrestlers (Chicago)
(For many years, the AWA ran joint shows with the World Wrestling Association at the International Amphitheater in Chicago)

 Dick the Bruiser
 Reggie Lisowski (The Crusher)
 Dr X
 Ox Baker
 Moose Cholak
 Sailor Art Thomas
 Bobo Brazil
 Bob Luce (Chicago wrestling promoter)
 Sam Menacker (host of the Indianapolis-based program segments)
 Chief Don Eagle
 Prince Pullins
 Paul Christy
 Spike Huber
 Johnny Kace
 Ernie Ladd
 Pepper Gomez
 "Pretty Boy" Bobby Heenan (manager)
 Wilbur Snyder

AWA female wrestlers
 Penny Banner†
 Candi Devine†
 Sherri Martel†
 Judy Martin
 Brandi Mae
 Madusa Miceli
 Magnificent Mimi
 Wendi Richter
 Vivian Vachon†

AWA Promoters
 Wally Karbo (Minneapolis)
 Joe Dusek (Omaha)
 Gene Reed (Denver)
 Bob Luce (Chicago and Indianapolis)
 Don Marxen (Moline and Davenport)
 Eddie Williams (St. Paul)
 Buddy Lee Cliff (Rockford)
 Ben Sternberg (Rochester, Minnesota)
 Alexander Turk (Winnipeg) (1961-1962)
 John "Cyclone" Macalpine (Winnipeg) (1962-1964)
 John Guglyn (Winnipeg) 
 Al Tomko (Winnipeg) (1966-1979)
 Don Brinton (Winnipeg) (1979-1986)
 Dwaine Hoberg (Fargo-Moorhead)
 Dennis Hilgart (Milwaukee)
 Ed Francis (Hawaii)
 Ed Tracy (Cedar Rapids/Waterloo)
 Jack Berry (Madison, Wisconsin)
 John Olsen (Salt Lake City)
 Leo Nomellini (San Francisco/Oakland)
 Harvey Solon (Duluth, Minnesota)
 Al DeRusha (Smaller towns in Minnesota)
 Frank Carson (Peoria)
 Lloyd Bolkcom (River towns in Illinois and Iowa)

Other notable AWA contributors

 Eric Bischoff (interviewer)
 Stanley Blackburn (on-air president)
 Lord James Blears (wrestler/commentator)
 Gary DeRusha (referee)
 "Scrap Iron" George Gadaski (wrestler/referee)
 Donna Gagne (ring announcer)
 Paul E. Dangerously (manager)
 Lord Alfred Hayes (manager)
 Bobby Heenan (manager)
 Dick Jonkowski (ring announcer/commentator)
 Rodger Kent (ringside announcer)
 Scott LeDoux (referee)
 Lee Marshall (announcer/commentator)
 Marty Miller (referee)
 Joe Fiorino  (referee mostly in Winnipeg, Manitoba)
 Larry Nelson (interviewer/ring announcer/commentator)
 Marty O'Neil (interviewer/commentator)
 Gene Okerlund (interviewer)
 Diamond Dallas Page (manager)
 Ken Resnick (interviewer/commentator)
 Ralph Strangis (commentator/ring announcer)
 Rod Trongard (commentator)

Alumni
American Wrestling Association alumni